The Buller cricket team represents the Buller District on the north-west coast of New Zealand's South Island, with its headquarters in Westport. It competes in the Hawke Cup, which it won in 2016.

History
Cricket began in Buller in the 1860s. In the early years of the 20th century the Buller Cricket Association was formed. It was granted affiliation with the New Zealand Cricket Council in 1925.

Buller players are eligible to represent Canterbury in the Plunket Shield. Several have done so, and three have represented New Zealand.

Buller first competed for the Hawke Cup, the pinnacle of district cricket in New Zealand, in 1947. They have the smallest population base of any of the 21 Hawke Cup teams. Captained by Troy Scanlon, who took nine wickets, they won the title in January 2016 when they defeated Canterbury Country. Scanlon also took nine wickets when they unsuccessfully defended the title against North Otago a fortnight later in Westport.

There are four teams in the Buller Cricket Association: Athletic, High School, Ngakawau and Old Boys.

References

Cricket teams in New Zealand
Sport in the West Coast, New Zealand